Maria Keil (9 August 1914 – 10 June 2012) was a Portuguese visual artist. She was born in Silves and died in Lisbon.

Maria Keil produced a vast and diversified work that includes painting, drawing and illustration, azulejo, graphic and furniture design, tapestry and scenography. Particularly noteworthy is her intense activity as an illustrator, as well as the crucial role she played in the renovation of contemporary tiles in Portugal.

In 2013, the Museum of the Presidency of the Republic organized a retrospective exhibition covering the multiple aspects of her work. It has a library named after her in Lisbon at Lumiar.

Biography
Maria Keil was born in Silves, in the Portuguese region of Algarve, daughter of Francisco da Silva Pires and Maria José Silva. From 1929 she attended the Preparatory Course at the School of Fine Arts in Lisbon and then the painting course (which never ends), where she is a student of Veloso Salgado. Her artistic practice has been characterized, since the beginning, by the diversity of techniques and means of expression. Throughout her life she will engage in a multitude of areas, including painting and drawing, illustration, graphic arts, printmaking, tiles, tapestry, furniture, decoration, scenography and costumes.

In 1933 she married architect Francisco Keil do Amaral and two years later her only son, Francisco Pires Keil do Amaral (or Pitum Keil do Amaral) was born.

In 1936 she became a member of the ETP (Technical Advertising Studio, then formed by José Rocha), establishing friendship with Carlos Botelho, Fred Kradolfer, Ofélia Marques and Bernardo Marques. In the next year, she made a stay in Paris during the construction of the Pavilion of the International Exhibition of Paris (of which Keil do Amaral was an architect), for which she made a decorative motif in Sala IV – Ultramar (Salle IV – Outremer).

She exhibits individually for the first time in 1939 (since there are no art galleries, the exhibition takes place at Galeria Larbom, a furniture store on Rua do Ouro, Lisbon); in that same year she participates in the S.P.N IV Modern Art Exhibition. She participates in the SPN shows of the next two years, winning the Souza-Cardoso Revelation Prize in 1941 with Self Portrait, 1941.

In 1940, she designed sets and costumes for the ballet Lenda das Amendoeiras, presented at the debut show of the Companhia de bailado Verde Gaio.

Between 1946 and 1956 she regularly participates in the General Expositions of Plastic Arts, SNBA, Lisbon. She held an individual exhibition in 1945 and, again, in 1955: "this is a historical exhibition, as it marks, within the scope of Portuguese art, levels of pioneering innovation in the fields of furniture and, above all, tiles" (this exhibition she highlighted the work of designing furniture for domestic interiors and, also, for commercial spaces related to restaurants and hotels, to which she dedicated herself since the beginning of the 1940s and until the middle of the following decade). There follows a long hiatus in which she dedicates herself to a multiplicity of activities, to exhibit again individually from 1983.

Among the areas to which she devoted herself with greater continuity, the illustration should be highlighted. Multifaceted, Maria Keil wrote and illustrated books for children and adults, having publications entirely of her own (text and image) or illustrating works by Matilde Rosa Araújo, Aquilino Ribeiro, Sophia de Mello Breyner Andresen, José Gomes Ferreira, Augusto Abelaira, Mário Dionísio, José Rodrigues Miguéis, Ilse Losa, among others.

Another striking aspect of her work and where she most distinguished herself was the tile, in which she began to work in the early 1950s. Maria Keil will become one of the main figures of modern renovation in this area. Of her vast production, the tile panel O mar, on Avenida Infante Santo, Lisbon, and the extensive collaboration for the Metropolitano de Lisboa can be highlighted. Beginning in 1957, this work would continue until approximately 1972, with the inauguration of the last stations of that first phase: Arroios, Alameda, Areeiro, Roma and Alvalade. Maria Keil was the author of the panels for all the initial stations with the exception of Avenida. From 1977, some of these panels were totally or partially destroyed, due to the expansion of several stations, including Saldanha, Restauradores and Intendente. In 1978 she participates in the traveling exhibition 5 Centuries of Tiles in Portugal (Rio de Janeiro, São Paulo, Brasília and Caracas); from that date, her work is part of the main exhibitions (in Portugal and abroad) dedicated to tiles in Portugal. In 1989, the Museu Nacional do Azulejo organized a comprehensive exhibition on this facet of her work.

On 9 April 1981, she was awarded the rank of Commander of the Military Order of Sant'Iago da Espada.

In 2013, the Museum of the Presidency of the Republic organized, at the Cascais Citadel Palace, in partnership with the Cascais Town Hall, the exhibition On purpose – Maria Keil, artistic work, presenting a retrospective and comprehensive view of her works.

Style and works
The initial stages of her work are closely linked to the graphic arts and her participation in the Technical Studio of Advertising (formed by José Rocha). It is there that she learns the renewing spirit that was initially driven by the example of Fred Kradolfer: "The graphics of Maria Keil, informed in that of Kradolfer [...], as if she opposed the solid geometric hardness of the Swiss, the natural delicacy of the game of transparent nets."

Throughout her life she will use, with enormous freedom of movement, a modernizing language that articulates sensitive figuration with a formal, often geometrized, simplified universe. This particular language runs through her entire work as an illustrator (and is present in much of her production on tiles). Oscillating between the direct, simple and immediate image, and the fusion of spaces or even the subtle surrealization of the narrative, Maria Keil starts "from a real situation, […] takes from her only what already brings her a touch of unreality. Then, and based on that, she sketches figures of a new reality that is characteristic of her art."

"The graphic process of over-articulation of planes becomes a compositional structure in painting, capable of making the contours of the linear shape coincide with the limits of the flat color, through the relation of plastic equivalences. A visual logic of reducing obstacles, suppressing artifices formal, in the sense of clarity, almost transparent, of the image." This desire for clarification is present in the self-portrait of 1941, dominated by the "architectural presence" of the figure, which functions as the axis of the composition, controlling and dominating "her own presence, through the discreet theatricality of small gestures."

Her first experiences in azulejo date back to 1954 (TAP delegation in Paris and Aerogare de Luanda); they represent an extension of the attempts of renovation of the Portuguese tile carried out by Jorge Barradas, Carlos Botelho, Bernardo Marques or Fred Kradolfer.

Her choice for tiles is due to the support of the new generation of architects, including her husband, Keil do Amaral, but also with personal motivations: "After the second exhibition, I came to the conclusion that it was not worth continuing when painting, the world is full of good painting […]. Architecture is a very serious thing, I found it more useful to do things for architecture."

"Maria Keil did not bet on the renovation of the azulejo from a mere vocabulary change, because she invented another language for the tile, from a methodical construction of spatial-optical effects." Her first major work in this field dates from 1958 to 1959 (studies are from 1956 to 1958) and is entitled O mar. With a clearly symbolic chromatism where blues and greens predominate, this work matches the figurative allusions (the image of the fisherman with his son, boats, shells ...) with the markedly decorative tendency of the entire panel, dominated by geometric patterns: "her cultural reference is not located in the pictorial panels, historians or naturalists of erudite production, but in its determinant borders where the possibilities of geometry and color are transmuted into rhythms."

For the vast order of the Metropolitano de Lisboa (1957 – c. 1972), she will opt for strictly abstract forms, experimenting with variations where shapes inherited from the history of the tile intersect with abstract elements that may originate, for example, in Neoplasticism: "languages and values, Maria Keil senses the path of a contemporary condition that reuses successive and disparate poetics as operative signs, aiming at the absolute availability of the interplay of forms and colors."

Azulejos/Lisbon Metro

Awards
 Souza-Cardoso Award, SPN, 1941.
 Acquisition Grand Prix, National Academy of Fine Arts (2009)
 In 2020, the Portuguese Ministry of Culture took on the responsibility of inventorying and studying its estate. This agreement, signed with her son Francisco Keil do Amaral known as Pitum, also contemplates the deposition and exhibition of it in one of the museums under the responsibility of the Directorate-General for Cultural Heritage (DGPC).

References

1914 births
2012 deaths
20th-century Portuguese women artists
21st-century Portuguese women artists
People from Silves, Portugal
Portuguese modernist artists